Aren Davoudi Chegani (born July 12, 1986) is a professional Iranian basketball player of Armenian descent who currently plays for Hamyari Shahrdari of the Iranian Super League and also for the Iranian national basketball team. He is a 6-foot point guard.

From 2007, Davoudi has also been a member of the Iran national basketball team, but he first played for the team during their second consecutive gold medal run at the FIBA Asia Championship 2009. He saw action in six of nine games off the bench.

Honours

National team
Asian Championship
Gold medal: 2009, 2013
Asian Games
Bronze medal: 2010
Asian Under-18 Championship
Gold medal: 2004
Silver medal: 2002

References

External links 
 FIBA profile
 Universiade profile

Living people
1986 births
Sportspeople from Isfahan
Iranian men's basketball players
Iranian people of Armenian descent
Asian Games silver medalists for Iran
Asian Games bronze medalists for Iran
Asian Games medalists in basketball
Basketball players at the 2010 Asian Games
Basketball players at the 2018 Asian Games
Zob Ahan Esfahan F.C. sportspeople
Point guards
Medalists at the 2010 Asian Games
Medalists at the 2018 Asian Games
2010 FIBA World Championship players